Lycium ferocissimum, the African boxthorn, is a species of shrub in the family Solanaceae (nightshades). They have a self-supporting growth form. Individuals can grow to 1.5 m.

Sources

References 

ferrocissimum
Flora of Malta